Keep the Home Fires Burning may refer to:

 "Keep the Home Fires Burning" (1914 song), a British patriotic song by Ivor Novello and Lena Gilbert Ford
 "Keep the Home Fires Burning" (The Bluetones song), 2000
 Keep the Home Fires Burning, a 2004 novel by Anne Baker (author)
 "Keep the Home Fires Burning", a series 4 episode of the TV series The Flaxton Boys

See also 
Home Fires (disambiguation)
 "Keep the Home Fries Burning", an episode of the TV series Murder, She Wrote
 "Keep the Homes Fires Burning", a season 5 episode of the TV series Designing Women